Lars Thomsson (born 1964) is a Swedish politician and member of the Riksdag for the Centre Party. He joined the Riksdag after the 2018 general elections, he is currently taking up seat number 14 in the Riksdag for the constituency of Gotland County. He is a member of the Swedish delegation to the OSCE, and he serves as an alternate in the Riksdag for the Committee on Finance, Committee on Defence, and the Committee on Justice.

References 

1964 births
Living people
Members of the Riksdag from the Centre Party (Sweden)
Members of the Riksdag 2018–2022